Mocis phasianoides is a species of moth of the family Erebidae. It is found in Uruguay and Paraguay.

References

Moths described in 1919
Mocis
Moths of South America
Taxa named by Achille Guenée